Acoustic LP is a limited run, tour only album by Christians & Lions. It was recorded by Djim Reynolds at The Estate in Leominster, Massachusetts. Art by Conor Morey-Barret. Photos by Athena Moore. Mastered by Justin Shrutz & Jason Finkel at Sterling Sound in NYC. Thanks to Dave Conway.

It is available to download for free on the band's website for a suggested donation.

Track listing 
 Free Radio Post-Apocalyptic Metropolis Blues
 Stay Warm
 Landing
 A Root’s Grave Is Above Ground
 Longboy
 Bodega
 Tender Sparks (October and Over)
 Some Trees
 Sexton Under Glass
 Firebelly Salamander
 Bones
 Skinny Fists

Personnel 
 Ben Potrykus – vocals, guitar, singing saw.
 Sam Potrykus – bass, vocals.
 Matt Sisto – guitar, organ, piano.
 Chris Mara – drums, aux percussion.
 Chris Barrett – trumpet.

References 

2006 albums
Christians & Lions albums